The 1977 Chicago White Sox season in the American League saw the team finish third in the American League West, at 90-72, 12 games behind the Kansas City Royals.

Offseason 
White Sox owner Bill Veeck tried a new philosophy during the offseason: figuring that if he could not compete with the bigger spending clubs for free agents, he would "rent" them, even if only for one year. With this strategy in mind, he traded for Richie Zisk (who had one year remaining on his contract) and Oscar Gamble (also in the final year of his contract), hoping that he would be able to continue the practice financially.

Notable transactions 
 October 6, 1976: Minnie Miñoso was released by the White Sox.
 October 21, 1976: Phil Roof was traded by the White Sox to the Toronto Blue Jays for a player to be named later. The Blue Jays completed the deal by sending Larry Anderson to the White Sox on January 5.
 November 26, 1976: Eric Soderholm was signed as a free agent by the White Sox.
 December 5, 1976: Royle Stillman was signed as a free agent by the White Sox.
 December 10, 1976: Goose Gossage and Terry Forster were traded by the White Sox to the Pittsburgh Pirates for Richie Zisk and Silvio Martínez.
 January 11, 1977: Mark Esser was drafted by the White Sox in the 8th round of the 1977 Major League Baseball draft.
 January 26, 1977: Blue Moon Odom was released by the White Sox.
 February 15, 1977: Fritz Peterson was signed as a free agent by the White Sox.

Regular season 
On April 7 in Toronto, the White Sox played the Toronto Blue Jays in the first game in Blue Jays history.

The White Sox, who came to be called the "South Side Hitmen", were in solid contention for most of the season, battling the division-winning Royals and Minnesota Twins most of the way. They moved into first place in the AL West on July 1 and remained there until August 12. Their primary weapon was their power hitting. As a team, the White Sox hit 192 home runs, a record which lasted until 1996. Their displays of power caused fans to cheer for "curtain calls", where players came out of the dugout after hitting a home run to acknowledge those cheers. Some Royals players greatly resented this, and called such behavior "bush" and "unprofessional." The climax of this came on August 5, when White Sox pitcher Bart Johnson and Royals catcher Darrell Porter had a fistfight in a game at Kansas City.

Opening Day lineup 
 Ralph Garr, Left field
 Alan Bannister, Shortstop
 Jorge Orta, Second base
 Richie Zisk, Right field
 Jim Spencer, First base
 Oscar Gamble, Designated hitter
 Eric Soderholm, Third base
 Chet Lemon, Center field
 Brian Downing, Catcher
 Ken Brett, Pitcher

Season standings

Record vs. opponents

Notable transactions 
 April 5, 1977: Bucky Dent was traded by the White Sox to the New York Yankees for Oscar Gamble, LaMarr Hoyt, Bob Polinsky (minors), and $200,000.
 August 20, 1977: Steve Staniland (minors) was traded by the White Sox to the St. Louis Cardinals for Don Kessinger.
 August 31, 1977: The White Sox traded players to be named later to the St. Louis Cardinals for Clay Carroll. The White Sox completed the deal by sending Nyls Nyman to the Cardinals on September 2, and sending Dave Hamilton and Silvio Martínez to the Cardinals on November 28.

Roster

Player stats

Batting 
Note: G = Games played; AB = At bats; R = Runs scored; H = Hits; 2B = Doubles; 3B = Triples; HR = Home runs; RBI = Runs batted in; BB = Base on balls; SO = Strikeouts; AVG = Batting average; SB = Stolen bases

Pitching 
Note: W = Wins; L = Losses; ERA = Earned run average; G = Games pitched; GS = Games started; SV = Saves; IP = Innings pitched; H = Hits allowed; R = Runs allowed; ER = Earned runs allowed; HR = Home runs allowed; BB = Walks allowed; K = Strikeouts

Awards and honors

All-Stars 
All-Star Game
 Richie Zisk, starter, outfield

Farm system 

LEAGUE CHAMPIONS: GCL White Sox

Notes

References 
 
 1977 Chicago White Sox at Baseball Reference
 1977 Chicago White Sox at Baseball Almanac

Chicago White Sox seasons
Chicago White Sox season
Chicago